Giuseppe Partini (Siena, 1842–1895) was an Italian architect, mostly involved in reconstructions in his native Siena.

He was active with the sculptor Tito Sarocchi in the reconstruction of the  Fonte Gaia in Piazza del Campo in Siena Italy, replacement of its original panels with copies.  He also helped in the reconstruction of the Palazzi Marsili and Tantucci in Siena. He was an architects involved with maintenance of the Duomo of Siena. He reconstructed the Palazzo di Giustizia in Chiavari.

References

1842 births
1895 deaths
19th-century Italian architects
Architects from Tuscany
People from Siena